The 1952 Kilkenny Senior Hurling Championship was the 58th staging of the Kilkenny Senior Hurling Championship since its establishment by the Kilkenny County Board.

On 31 August 1952, Bennettsbridge won the championship after a 5-03 to 4-05 defeat of Tullaroan in the final. It was their second ever championship title overall and their first title since 1890.

Results

Final

References

Kilkenny Senior Hurling Championship
Kilkenny Senior Hurling Championship